Absolutely the Best may refer to:

 Absolutely the Best (Odetta album), 2000
 Absolutely the Best of Helen Reddy, 2003